State Road 362 in the U.S. state of Indiana is a short seven-mile (11 km) route in the southeastern portion of the state.

Route description
State Road 362 straddles the Clark County border with Scott and Jefferson counties.  It begins at State Road 3 near Garry's Trucking Service and runs directly east along the county line, intersecting with State Road 203 and passing through the town of Nabb.  It terminates where it reaches State Road 62 north of New Washington.

Major intersections

References

External links

 Indiana Highway Ends - SR 362

362
Transportation in Clark County, Indiana
Transportation in Jefferson County, Indiana
Transportation in Scott County, Indiana